A virtual enterprise (VE) is a temporary alliance of businesses that come together to share skills or core competencies  and resources in order to better respond to business opportunities, and whose cooperation is supported by computer networks.

It is a manifestation of distributed collaborative networks. A virtual enterprise is a particular case of virtual organization.

Virtual enterprises have become increasingly common in the area of research and development, with often far-flung organizations forming alliances that amount to a "Virtual Research Laboratory." Vassiliou (2007)  outlined a broad continuum of possible virtual laboratory relationships, ranging from relatively simple outsourcing by a central organization to tightly knit consortia of collaborating entities.

Definitions 
Several definitions include:

 "…a temporary network of independent institutions, businesses or specialised individuals, who work together in a spontaneous fashion by way of information and communication technology, in order to gain an extant competitive edge. They integrate vertically, unify their core-competencies and function as one organisation (or organisational unit)” (Fuehrer, 1997);
 “…a temporary network of independent companies, suppliers, customers – even rivals, linked by information technology to share costs, skills and access one another’s markets. It will have neither central office nor organisational chart… no hierarchy, no vertical integration…” (Byrne);
 “…a temporary network that exists through telematic networks and aims to share skills, resources, costs and benefits to achieve one or more projects answering to the market opportunities for products and services” (Pallet);
 "…an identifiable group of people or organisations whose use of ICT is substantially greater than with other types of organisation, thereby reducing the necessity of their physical presence together for the transaction of business or for doing work collaboratively in order to realise common objectives" (Hill, 1997);
 “…refers to a new organisational form characterised by a temporary or permanent collection of geographically dispersed individuals, groups or organisation departments not belonging to the same organisation – or entire organisations, that are dependent on electronic communication for carrying out their production process” (Travica, 1997);
 “…the VE does not exist in the physical sense but only on an electronic network representing a partnership of businesses existing as a nebulous form of business organisation that only exists to meet a market opportunity” (Campbell Alistair);
 "…a dynamic alliance between organisations that bring in complementary competencies and resources and that are collectively available to each other, with the objective of delivering a product or service to the market as a collective" (Ten Have amongst others, 1997);
 “…a strategic alliance amongst non-competing companies who share forces – using mostly ICT – for the accomplishment of a specific goal without losing their autonomy – except for the undertakings set forth in the VE agreement – and with the aim of avoiding the formation of a new legal entity” (Maurizio Raffaini, 2001).

Characteristics 
All of these definitions indicate some common characteristics summarized as:
 boundary crossing
 complementary core competencies
 geographical dispersion
 complementary nature of the partners
 participant equality
 extensive use of information and communications technology
 temporary
 no creation of a new legal entity

Projects 
Several European Union projects in the Framework Programmes for Research and Technological Development focused on virtual enterprises:
 Business Integrator Dynamic Support Agents for Virtual Enterprise (BIDSAVER) from January 2000 through June 2002
 Working group on Advanced Legal Issues in Virtual Enterprise (ALIVE) from January 2000 through December 2002
 Legal issues for the advancement of information society technologies (LEGAL-IST) from April 2004 through March 2007
 European collaborative networked organizations leadership initiative (ECOLEAD) from April 2004 through March 2008
 Secure Process-oriented Integrative Service Infrastructure for Networked Enterprises (SPIKE) from January 2008 through December 2010
 Glocal enterprise network focusing on customer-centric collaboration (GloNet) from September 2011 through August 2014
 Business Innovation and Virtual Enterprise Environment (BIVEE) from September 2011 through August 2014

Another example of virtual enterprise is found in the United States Army Research Laboratory's
Federated Laboratories, or "Fedlabs."  These began in 1996, and represented close partnerships between ARL and several industrial and academic organizations, as well as various non-profit entities. The first three FedLabs were in Advanced Displays, Advanced Sensors, and Telecommunications.  Each FedLab was a large consortium, with both an overall industrial leader and an ARL leader. The cooperative agreements forming the FedLabs were somewhat unusual in that the ARL was not a mere funder of research, but an active consortium participant.

An overview of related projects (up to 2005) can be found in a book by Camarinha-Matos et al. (2005).

Communities 
Since 1999 the International Federation for Information Processing (IFIP) and Society of Collaborative Networks (SOCOLNET) sponsored an annual conference called the Working Conference on Virtual Enterprises (PRO-VE).

Over the last couple of decades, we have seen a major shift from an industrial economy to that of an information economy. This led to new technology  to help capitalise on the information economy. Virtual enterprises allow businesses to specialize and be flexible within their environments. This business model had been applied to outsourcing and supply chains, as well as temporary consortia. Because the formation of virtual enterprises is an intricate process, a new form of technological support has been developed. The most ambitious of the support systems actually intends to automate part of the creation process, as well as the operation of these enterprises.
A comprehensive overview of the state of the art, methods and tools can be found in Camarinha-Matos et al. (2008).

As with all types of enterprises, virtual enterprises present both benefits and challenges.  Benefits include more economical connections with suppliers, greater opportunities to create revenue, more efficient operations, and a reduction in administrative costs.  Challenges facing virtual enterprises are: inexperienced users, security, expense control, and the level of incorporation required to create a successful virtual enterprise.

Examples of virtual enterprises on the Internet included Virtual Music Enterprises (from about 2004 through 2010) and  Virtual Enterprise California which is part of the Virtual Enterprises, International educational group.

CNO life cycle
Because a virtual enterprise is considered a collaborative networked organization (CNO), its organizational life cycle is different in terms of time spend on creation (entrepreneurial stage) and dissolution (decline). The CNO life cycle includes the stages:
 Creation (initiation and foundation): During the initiation a strategic plan is made for the operational stage and the foundation of the CNO is executed by the constitution and actual start up.
 Operation: Execution of operations within the defined scope of the strategic plan.
 Evolution: The context of virtual organizations is rapidly changing and therefore in continuous evolution of its operation within the current strategic plan this means minor alterations.
 Metamorphosis or Dissolution: Because CNOs have gained significant experience during their relatively short lives (compared to brick-and-mortar organizations) they keep the knowledge by metamorphosing into a new organization (changing its form) with a new purpose.

References

Further reading
 Chakma, J., Calcagno, J.L., Behbahan, A., Mojtahedian, S. Is it Virtuous to be Virtual? The VC Viewpoint. Nature Biotechnology 27(10), 886-888 (2009).
 Raffaini, Maurizio (2001). Virtual Enterprise Legal Framework, in Bidsaver Project (IST 10768), Bruxelles;
 Raffaini, Maurizio (2001). The Virtual Organisation, in Proceedings of the 7th International Conference on Concurrent Enterprising, Bremen;
 Raffaini, Maurizio (2001). Microsatellite Pilot Case Legal Issues, in Bidsaver Project (IST 10768), Bruxelles;
 Raffaini, Maurizio (2001). Mechanical Equipment Pilot Case Legal Issues, in Bidsaver Project (IST 10768), Bruxelles;
 Raffaini, Maurizio (2002). The nature and legal identity of the VEs, in Alive Project (IST 25459), Bruxelles;
 Raffaini, Maurizio (2002). The VE Legal Identity and the actors’ roles, in Proceedings of the 8th International Conference on Concurrent Enterprising, Rome.

Business models